The Special Operations Battalion, or popularly BSD was founded on 8 September 2000 when the Special Combat Skills Center from Šepurine and the 1st Croatian Guards Brigade (a component of the 1st Croatian Guards Corps) were amalgamated. It ceased to exist in 2014, when it was transformed into the Special Operations Command.

The BSD members can be recognized by their green berets with unit badges over the right eye. Their symbol is a snake, so they are sometimes referred as "Cobras" although their insignia shows a Horned viper which is the most dangerous snake to be found in Croatia and in mainland Europe.

Main tasks
The Battalion was focused on airborne assault as well as operations behind enemy lines with insertion from land, air or sea. However, unlike most special forces in the world, the Battalion is also trained in non-combat search and rescue of civilians and providing aid as well as dealing with natural disasters. The unit was equipped with the most sophisticated weapons and equipment available, and trained to undertake the full range of special ops missions and even the dangerous mid-air, aircraft-to-aircraft operations.
Personnel were trained for:
Combat operations on land, air and sea on all types of terrains and all weather conditions
Deep battlefield infiltration by land, air and sea
Unconventional warfare behind enemy lines
Counter-terrorism and hand-to-hand combat
CSAR missions (Combat Search and Rescue)
Humanitarian and peacekeeping operations

The Croatian General Staff exercised direct command over the battalion which thus elevated the unit to strategic level for quicker response time and overall better and faster deployment on both tactical and strategic levels. Also, this meant that members of all three branches of the Croatian armed forces could apply for selection. In 2008, two women successfully completed selection and training, earning their green berets and making the BSD one of the few special forces units in the world that have women among their ranks as combat qualified operators and not just support staff.

Structure of BSD

The BSD was composed of one command section and five companies, each  specialized for a different variety of missions:
Command Section - responsible for command, control and communications, supplies, medical personnel and transport 
1st Special Operations Company - specialized for airborne and pathfinder operations 
2nd Special Operations Company - specialized for alpine and mountain operations
3rd Special Operations Company - specialized for naval and amphibious operations
4th Special Operations Company - specialized for urban and anti-terrorist operations 
Fire Support Company - specialized for sniper and mortar training, also provides fire support with snipers to other four BSD companies

Equipment

Weapons
Handguns

Submachine guns

Assault rifles

Machine guns

Sniper rifles

Shotguns

Grenade launchers

Mortars

Anti-aircraft weapons

Anti-tank weapons

Vehicles

Helicopters

Vessels
Olimp Nautika M46  
R-2M Mala Diver’s Delivery Vessel

International engagements

BSD members have been deployed on several peacekeeping operations and missions in the world. BSD was engaged in EUFOR Tchad/RCA, ISAF within ISAF SOF TF-50 detached from Polish Jednostka Wojskowa Komandosów.

Gallery

References

Military units and formations of Croatia
Military units and formations established in 2000
Military special forces battalions
2000 establishments in Croatia
2014 disestablishments in Croatia
Military units and formations disestablished in 2014